Aubrey Robinson (1853–1936) was an owner of a sugarcane plantation and a ranch consisting of an entire island  in the Hawaiian Islands.

Life
Aubrey Robinson was born in Canterbury, New Zealand on October 17, 1853. His father was Charles Barrington Robinson and mother was Helen Sinclair. His grandmother, Elizabeth McHutchison (1800–1892), also spelled McHutcheson, was born in Glasgow, Scotland, married Francis Sinclair in 1824 and moved to New Zealand in 1840 with their six children. In 1846 her husband and eldest son died at sea.
With her remaining children and grandchildren, she left New Zealand heading for Canada.
When they arrived in the Hawaiian Islands in September 1863, King Kamehameha IV suggested they stay and purchase some land. Although the King soon died, the family purchased the entire island of Niihau from King Kamehameha V for US$10,000 ($ today) on January 23, 1864.  In 1865, Eliza Sinclair purchased the  ahupuaa of Makaweli, on Kauaʻi, from Victoria
Kamāmalu Ka‘ahumanu for $15,000 ($ today).

Robinson was educated at home and attended the Boston University School of Law and was admitted to the bar in eastern courts. He spent a number of years traveling in Europe and Asia, and, on his return to Hawaii, managed the family estates after the death of his uncle Francis Sinclair with his cousin (also brother-in-law), Francis Gay, under the firm name of Gay & Robinson.
Other partners were Elizabeth Sinclair, Jane Sinclair Gay and Helen Sinclair Robinson. Their island of Niihau was used exclusively by Gay & Robinson for grazing cattle, as was much of their Makaweli estate. Robinson raised pure-bred sheep and cattle, and imported strains of Merino sheep and shorthorn cattle from the United States, Australia and New Zealand.

In 1884, Robinson imported purebred Arabian horses. Robinson took an active interest in church and missionary work both in Hawaii and abroad.

Family and legacy
His aunt Anne Sinclair married Kauai sugar planter Valdemar Knudsen (1819–1898) in 1867.
Robinson married his first cousin Alice Gay in 1885, daughter of Captain Thomas Gay and Jane (Sinclair) Gay. They had four sons: Sinclair Robinson (1886–1964), Aylmer Francis Robinson (1888–1967), Selwyn Aubrey Robinson (1892–1984), and Lester Beauclerk Robinson (1901–1969) and one daughter, Eleanor (1898–1986). 

Robinson died on his estate in 1936, and the Kauai estate passed to his wife and their five children and Niihau going to Aylmer and Lester.
His descendants have kept the tradition of treating Niihau as private, earning it the name "Forbidden Island".
Niihau was owned by Lester's wife Helen Matthew Robinson (1910–2002) and then , her sons Bruce and Keith Robinson.

See also
 Sugar plantations in Hawaii

References

1853 births
1936 deaths
People from Banks Peninsula
American planters
Ranchers from Hawaii